Mark Berry may refer to:

Mark Berry (weightlifter) (1896–1958), American weight lifter, author and trainer
Mark Berry (baseball) (born 1962), American baseball player, coach, and manager
Mark Berry (dancer) (born 1964), British dancer and percussionist, commonly known as Bez
Mark Berry (lawyer), chair of the Commerce Commission, in New Zealand
Mark S. Berry, American music producer